Love Is a Basic Need is the seventh studio album by English rock band Embrace. It was released on 2 March 2018 through Cooking Vinyl.

Track listing

Charts

References 

2018 albums
Embrace (English band) albums
Cooking Vinyl albums